Oreobates cruralis, also known as the La Paz robber frog, is a species of frog in the family Strabomantidae.
It is found in Bolivia, Peru, and possibly Brazil.
Its natural habitats are subtropical or tropical moist lowland forest, subtropical or tropical moist montane forest, plantations, rural gardens, and heavily degraded former forest.

References

cruralis
Amphibians of Bolivia
Amphibians of Peru
Taxonomy articles created by Polbot
Amphibians described in 1902